Laëtitia Stribick-Burckel is a former football player who played as goalkeeper for French club  Toulouse of the Division 1 Féminine.

International career

Stribick was selected as part of the French squad at the 2005 European Championships. Stribick earned only 1 cap for France.

References

External links

1984 births
Living people
French women's footballers
France women's youth international footballers
France women's international footballers
Women's association football goalkeepers
CNFE Clairefontaine players
ASJ Soyaux-Charente players
Toulouse FC (women) players
Division 1 Féminine players